Charles Victor Thompson (10 September 1885 – 11 May 1968) was an Australian  politician and journalist.

Thompson was elected to the Australian House of Representatives seat of New England at the 1922 election, representing the Country Party of Australia. He was a Minister without portfolio in the fourth Lyons ministry and the Page ministry from November 1937 until April 1940. He lost his seat at the September 1940 election to another member of the Country Party, Joe Abbott.

Early life
Thompson was born in Sydney on 10 September 1885, the son of Mary Annie (née Lewis) and Charles Thompson; his father was a carpenter. He was educated at public schools, including the Cleveland Street Public School.

Personal life
Thompson married Emma Bell in 1907, with whom he had one daughter. He died in Ashfield, New South Wales, on 11 May 1968, aged 82.

Notes

External links
 Australian Dictionary of Biography

1885 births
1968 deaths
National Party of Australia members of the Parliament of Australia
Members of the Australian House of Representatives for New England
Members of the Australian House of Representatives
20th-century Australian politicians